Aldomir Ridge is the mostly ice-free ridge on southern Trinity Peninsula in Graham Land, Antarctica, bounded by Sjögren Glacier to the west and Boydell Glacier to the east.  It extends 14 km between Detroit Plateau to the north-northwest and Sjögren Inlet to the south-southeast, its southeast extremity forming Royak Point. The ridge is 4.2 km wide and rising to 1445 m at its north extremity.

The ridge is named after the settlement of Aldomirovtsi in Western Bulgaria.

Location

Map
 Antarctic Digital Database (ADD). Scale 1:250000 topographic map of Antarctica. Scientific Committee on Antarctic Research (SCAR). Since 1993, regularly upgraded and updated.

Notes

References
 Aldomir Ridge. SCAR Composite Antarctic Gazetteer.
 Bulgarian Antarctic Gazetteer. Antarctic Place-names Commission. (details in Bulgarian, basic data in English)

External links
 Aldomir Ridge. Copernix satellite image

Ridges of Graham Land
Landforms of Trinity Peninsula
Bulgaria and the Antarctic